Langley Township is a township in Ellsworth County, Kansas, United States. At the 2010 census, its population was 150.

Geography
According to the USGS, it contains one cemetery, Langley.

The stream of Wiley Creek runs through this township.

References
 USGS Geographic Names Information System (GNIS)

External links
 City-Data.com

Townships in Ellsworth County, Kansas
Townships in Kansas